Valentin Blatz (October 1, 1826 – May 26, 1894) was a German-American brewer and banker.

Biography
Valentin Blatz was born in Miltenberg, Bavaria, and worked at his father's brewery in his youth. In August 1848, he immigrated to America, and by 1849 had moved to Milwaukee, Wisconsin.

Blatz established a brewery next to Johann Braun's City Brewery in 1850 and merged both breweries upon Braun's death in 1852. He also married Braun's widow.

The brewery produced Milwaukee's first individually bottled beer in 1874. It incorporated as the Valentin Blatz Brewing Company in 1889 and by the 1900s was the city's third largest brewer.

He was active in many organizations such as the Independent Order of Odd Fellows. Blatz was a freemason and member of Aurora Lodge No.30 in Milwaukee, Wisconsin.

Blatz died in St. Paul, Minnesota on May 26, 1894, while returning home to Milwaukee from a trip to California. He was survived by a wife, three sons, and two daughters.  He is buried in a massive family mausoleum at Forest Home Cemetery in Milwaukee.

Gallery

See also
 Eberhard Anheuser
 Jacob Best
 Adolphus Busch
 Adolph Coors
 Gottlieb Heileman
 Frederick Miller
 Frederick Pabst
 Joseph Schlitz
 August Uihlein

References

 
 
 

1826 births
1894 deaths
German emigrants to the United States
American drink industry businesspeople
People from the Kingdom of Bavaria
Businesspeople from Milwaukee
American brewers
19th-century American businesspeople